The Yamasees (also spelled Yamassees or Yemassees) were a multiethnic confederation of Native Americans who lived in the coastal region of present-day northern coastal Georgia near the Savannah River and later in northeastern Florida. The Yamasees engaged in revolts and wars with other native groups and Europeans living in North America, specifically from Florida to North Carolina.

The Yamasees, along with the Guale, are considered from linguistic evidence by many scholars to have been a Muskogean language people. For instance, the Yamasee term "Mico", meaning chief, is also common in Muskogee.

After the Yamasees migrated to the Carolinas, they began participating in the Indian slave trade in the American Southeast. They raided other tribes to take captives for sale to European colonists. Captives from other Native American tribes were sold into slavery, with some being transported to West Indian plantations. Their enemies fought back, and slave trading was a large cause of the Yamasee War.

History

Overview 

The Yamasees lived in coastal towns in what are now southeast Georgia, Florida, and South Carolina. The Yamasees migrated from Florida to South Carolina in the late 16th century, where they became friendly with European colonists. The Yamasees were joined by members of the Guale, a Mississippian culture chiefdom, and their cultures intertwined.

European colonization

Spanish contact 

The Hernando de Soto expedition of 1540 traveled into Yamasee territory, including the village of Altamaha.

In 1570, Spanish explorers established missions in Yamasee territory. The Yamasees were later included in the missions of the Guale province. Starting in 1675, the Yamasees were mentioned regularly on Spanish mission census records of the missionary provinces of Guale (central Georgia coast) and Mocama (present-day southeastern Georgia and northeastern Florida).  The Yamasees usually did not convert to Christianity and remained somewhat separated from the Catholic Christian Indians of Spanish Florida.

Pirate attacks on the Spanish missions in 1680 forced the Yamasees to migrate again. Some moved to Florida.  Others returned to the Savannah River lands, which were safer after the Westo had been destroyed.

English contact 

In 1687, some Spaniards attempted to send captive Yamasees to the West Indies as slaves. The tribe revolted against the Spanish missions and their Native allies, and moved into the English colony of the Carolina (present day South Carolina). They established several villages, including Pocotaligo, Tolemato, and Topiqui, in Beaufort County. A 1715 census conducted by Irish colonist John Barnwell counted 1,220 Yamasees living in ten villages near Port Royal.

Migration by the Yamasees to Charles Town (in the colony of Carolina) beginning in 1686 was likely in pursuit of trading opportunities with English colonists, or to escape the Spanish. In Charles Town, some Yamasee families looked toward Christian missionaries to educate their children in reading and writing as well as converting them to Christianity. Christian missionaries in Carolina may have had some success in converting the Yamasees and Guale because they had both become familiar with Spanish missionaries and were more open to conversion than other tribes.

Yamasee War and aftermath 

For decades, Yamasee raiders (frequently equipped with European firearms and working in concert with Carolinian settlers) conducted slave raids against Spanish-allied Indian tribes in the American Southeast. The Yamasees also conducted raids on the Spanish colonial settlement of St. Augustine. Indian captives of the Yamasees were transported to colonial settlements throughout Carolina, where they were sold to white colonists; frequently, many of these captives were then resold to West Indian slave plantations.

Many Yamasees soon became indebted to the colonists they traded with, as a result of duplicitous colonial mercantile practices. Infuriated by the practices of the colonists, the Yamasees resolved to go to war against them, forming a pan-tribal coalition and initiating a two-year long war by attacking the colonial settlement of Charles Town on April 15, 1715.

Bolstered by the large amount of Indian tribes they had managed to enlist into their coalition, the Yamasees staged large-scale raids against other colonial settlements in Carolina as well, leading to most colonists abandoning frontier settlements and seeking refuge in Charles Town. South Carolina Governor Charles Craven led a force which defeated the Yamasees at Salkechuh (also spelled Saltketchers or Salkehatchie) on the Combahee River. Eventually, Craven was able to drive the Yamasees across the Savannah River back into Spanish Florida. 

After the war, the Yamasees migrated southwards to the region around St. Augustine and Pensacola, where they formed an alliance with the Spanish colonial administration. These Yamasees continued to inhabit Florida until 1727, when the combination of a smallpox epidemic and raids by Col. John Palmer (leading fifty Carolinian militiamen and one hundred Indians) eventually led the many of the remaining Yamasees to disperse, with some joining the Seminole or Creek. Still others remained near St. Augustine until the Spanish relinquished control of the city to the British. At that time, they took with them around 90 Yamasees to Havana.

Culture 
Steven J. Oatis and other historians describe the Yamasees as a multi-ethnic amalgamation of several remnant Indian groups, including the Guale, La Tama, Apalachee, Coweta, and Cussita Creek.  Historian Chester B. DePratter describes the Yamasee towns of early South Carolina as consisting of lower towns, consisting mainly of Hitchiti-speaking Indians, and upper towns, consisting mainly of Guale Indians.

Slavery 
The Yamasees were one of the largest slave raiding tribes in the American Southeast during the late 17th century, and have been described as a "militaristic slaving society", having acquired firearms from European colonists. Their use of slave raids to exert dominance over other tribes is partially attributed to the Yamasee aligning with European colonists in order to maintain their own independence. It was typical of Native Americans to take captives during warfare, particularly young women and children, though the Yamasees soon began to transport their captives to Carolina to sell in Charles Town's slave markets. They soon began to conduct raids specifically to take captives and sell them in Carolina.

Diplomacy 
In 1713, Anglican missionaries in South Carolina sponsored the journey of a Yamasees man (whose actual name is unknown, as he was generally referred to as the "prince" or "Prince George") from Charles Town to London. Historians have noted that the motivation of the "prince" to visit London was a form of "religious diplomacy" on the part of the missionaries to further ties between the Yamasee and British colonists. The missionaries hoped that if the "prince" converted to Christianity while in London, it would ensure the Yamasee would become firm allies of the British colonists. Around the period that the "prince" travelled to London, the Yamasees were largely unwilling to be culturally assimilated by the Spanish, choosing to maintain stronger contacts with British colonists instead. The "prince" returned to Charles Town in 1715, right around the period when the Yamasee War broke out, and shortly after his family had been taken captive by Carolinian raiders and sold into slavery.

Archaeological research
The Yamasee Archeological Project was launched in 1989 to study Yamasee village sites in South Carolina. The project hoped to trace the people's origins and inventory their artifacts. The project located a dozen sites. Pocosabo and Altamaha have since been listed as archeological sites on the National Register of Historic Places.

Language

The name "Yamasee" perhaps comes from Muskogee yvmvsē, meaning "tame, quiet"; or perhaps from Catawban yį musí:, literally "people-ancient".

Little record remains of the Yamasee language. It is partially preserved in works by missionary Domingo Báez. Diego Peña was told in 1716-1717 that the Cherokee of Tuskegee Town also spoke Yamasee.

Hann (1992) asserted that Yamasee is related to the Muskogean languages.  This was based upon a colonial report that a Yamasee spy within a Hitchiti town could understand Hitichiti and was not detected as a Yamasee.  Francis Le Jau stated in 1711 that the Yamasee understood Creek.  He also noted that many Indians throughout the region used Creek and Shawnee as lingua francas, or common trading languages.  In 1716-1717, Diego Peña obtained information that showed that Yamasee and Hitchiti-Mikasuki were considered separate languages.

The Yamasee language, while similar to many Muskogean languages, is especially similar to Creek, for they share many words. Many Spanish missionaries in La Florida were dedicated to learning native languages, such as Yamasee, in an effort to communicate for the purpose of conversion. It also allowed the missionaries to learn about the people's own religion and to find ways to convey Christian ideas to them.

There is limited, inconclusive evidence suggesting the Yamasee language was similar to Guale. It is based on three pieces of information: 
 a copy of a 1681 Florida missions census that states that the people of Nuestra Señora de la Candelaria de la Tama speak "la lengua de Guale, y Yamassa" [the Guale and Yamasee language];
 a summary of two 1688 letters, sent by the Spanish Florida governor, that mentions prisoners speaking the "ydioma Yguala y Yamas, de la Prova de Guale" [the Yguala and Yamas language of the province of Guale]; and
 the Guale referred to the Cusabo as Chiluque, which is probably related to the Muscogee word čiló·kki, meaning "Red Moiety."

Linguists note that the Spanish documents are not originals and may have been edited at a later date. The name Chiluque is probably a loanword, as it seems also to have been absorbed into the Timucua language. Thus, the connection of Yamasee with Muskogean is unsupported.

A document in a British colonial archive suggests that the Yamasees originally spoke Cherokee, an Iroquoian language, but had learned another language. For a time they were allied with the Cherokee, but are believed to have been a distinct people.

Legacy
The name of the Yamasees survives in the town of Yemassee, South Carolina, in the Lowcountry close to where the Yamasee War began.  It is also used for the title of  William Gilmore Simms' 1835 historical novel The Yemassee: A Romance of Carolina, and by extension, Yemassee, the official literary journal of the University of South Carolina.

There are currently unrecognized Yamasees in Florida, and the black supremacist group Nuwaubian Nation associated with Dwight York has also used the name Yamassee Native American Moors of the Creek Nation.

See also
 John Barnwell, Irish colonist

Notes

References
 Anderson, William L. and James L. Lewis (1983) A guide to Cherokee documents in foreign archives. p. 269.
 Goddard, Ives. (2005). "The indigenous languages of the Southeast", Anthropological Linguistics, 47 (1), 1-60.
Green, William, Chester B. DePratter, and Bobby Southerlin. "The Yamasee in South Carolina: Native American Adaptation and Interaction along the Carolina Frontier", Another's Country: Archaeological and Historical Perspectives on Cultural Interactions in the Southern Colonies. Tuscaloosa, AL: University of Alabama Press, 2001. .
 Hudson, Charles M., Jr. (1990). The Juan Pardo Expeditions: Explorations of the Carolinas and Tennessee, 1566-1568. Washington, D.C. Smithsonian Institution Press.

Further reading
 Bossy, Denise I., ed. (2018). The Yamasee Indians: From Florida to South Carolina.  Lincoln: University of Nebraska Press.
 Boyd, Mark F. (1949). "Diego Peña's expedition to Apalachee and Apalachicolo in 1716", The Florida Historical Quarterly, 16 (1), 2-32.
 Boyd, Mark F. (1952). "Documents describing the second and third expeditions of lieutenant Diego Peña to Apalachee and Apalachicolo in 1717 and 1718," The Florida Historical Quarterly, 32 (2), 109-139.
 Hann, John H. (1991). Missions to the Calusa. Gainesville: University of Florida Press.
 Hann, John H. (1992). "Political leadership among the natives of Spanish Florida," The Florida Historical Quarterly, 71 (2), 188-208.
 Hann, John H. (1994). "Leadership nomenclature among Spanish Florida natives and its linguistics and associational implications", In P. B. Kwachka (Ed.), Perspectives on the Southeast: Linguistics, archaeology, and ethnohistory (pp. 94–105). Athens, GA: University of Georgia Press.
 Hann, John H. (1996). "The seventeenth-century forebears of the Lower Creeks and Seminoles",  Southeastern Archaeology, 15, 66-80.
 Hudson, Charles M., Jr. (1997). Knights of Spain, Warriors of the Sun: Hernando de Soto and the South's Ancient Chiefdoms. Athens, GA: University of Georgia Press.
 Sturtevant, William C. (1994). "The Misconnection of Guale and Yamasee with Muskogean". International Journal of American Linguistics, 60 (2), 139-48.
 Waddell, Gene. (1980). Indians of the South Carolina lowcountry, 1562-1751. Spartansburg, SC: The Reprint Company.
 Worth, John E. (1995). The struggle of the Georgia coast: An eighteenth-century Spanish retrospective on Guale and Mocama. Anthropological papers of the American Museum of Natural History (No. 75). New York.
 Worth, John E. (1998). The Timucuan chiefdoms of Spanish Florida (Vols. 1 & 2). Gainesville: University of Press of Florida.
 Worth, John E. (2000). "The Lower Creeks: Origins and early history", In B. G. McEwan (Ed.), Indians of the Greater Southeast: Historical archaeology and ethnohistory (pp. 265–298). Gainesville: University Press of Florida.
 Worth, John E. (2004). "Yamasee". In R. D. Fogelson (Ed.), Handbook of North American Indians: Southeast'' (Vol. 14, pp. 245–253). Washington, D.C.: Smithsonian Institution.

External links
 Yamasee artifacts found in South Carolina dig

Muskogean tribes
Indigenous peoples of the Southeastern Woodlands
History of the Thirteen Colonies
Native American tribes in Georgia (U.S. state)
Native American tribes in South Carolina
Unattested languages of North America